Jaime Blanco García (1 May 194424 September 2020) was a Spanish politician and President of Cantabria between 1990 and 1991.

From 1987 to 1990 he served in the Parliament of Cantabria. He was a member of the Spanish Congress of Deputies for Cantabria for five terms, and he served three terms in the Senate of Spain.

References

1944 births
2020 deaths
Leaders of political parties in Spain
Members of the Congress of Deputies (Spain)
Members of the Parliament of Cantabria
Members of the Senate of Spain
Presidents of Cantabria
People from Santander, Spain
Spanish Socialist Workers' Party politicians